Otieno may refer to:
Arnold Origi (born 1983), Kenyan footballer
Dalmas Otieno, Kenyan politician
Douglas Otieno Okola (born 1980), Kenyan boxer
Elijah Otieno (born 1988), Kenyan cricketer
Eric Otieno (born 1956), Kenyan field hockey player
Francis Otieno (born 1979), Kenyan cricketer
Frederick Outa Otieno, Kenyan politician
Ian Otieno (born 1993), Kenyan footballer
Irene Awino Otieno (born 1986), Kenyan rugby player
Isaac Oyieko (born 1979), Kenyan cricketer
Kennedy Otieno (born 1972), Kenyan cricketer
Martin Oduor-Otieno (1956), Kenyan businessman
Martin Otieno Ogindo, Kenyan politician
Moses Otieno Kajwang (born 1979), Kenyan politician
Musa Otieno (born 1973), Kenyan soccer player
Otieno Kajwang (1959–2014), Kenyan politician
Silvano Melea Otieno (born 1931–1986), Kenyan footballer
Stacy Awour Otieno (1990), Kenyan rugby player
Wambui Otieno (born 1936–2011), Kenyan politician
Zedekiah Otieno (born 1968), Kenyan footballer

See also
Killing of Irvo Otieno